Mateusz Wróbel (born 7 March 1993) is a Polish handball player for Conversano and the Polish national team.

References

1993 births
Living people
Sportspeople from Gdynia
Polish male handball players